Emily Kau'i Zuttermeister (March 8, 1909 - 1994) is Hula Master who was recognized as a Living Treasure of Hawaii by the Honpa Hongwanji Mission, and a recipient of a National Heritage Fellowship in 1984.

Personal life 
On March 8, 1909, Emily Kauiomakawelinalaniokamanookalanipo (also referred to as Emily Kaua'i) was born to Gabriel Kukahiwa and Elizabeth Kaili Kukahiwa. She was taken as a hānai by William Kamahumahu Kalani and Virginia A'ahulole Kalani. She remained in contact with her birth family. 

Kauiomakawelinalaniokamanookalanipo went to the St Ann's School and Benjamin Parker School on O'ahu and Waimea High School on Kaua'i. Kauiomakawelinalaniokamanookalanipo excelled in quilting and won blue ribbons in State Fairs and other craft competitions.

Kauiomakawelinalaniokamanookalanipo married Patrick J. McCabe and they had two children, Justina (1928) and Patrick Jr. (1929). However, they divorced shortly after. 

On October 13, 1934, Kauiomakawelinalaniokamanookalanipo married an American U.S. Navy Officer, Carl (Karl) Henry Zuttermeister Sr. Afterwards, she went by the name Emily Kau'i Zuttermeister.

During the late 1930s, Zuttermeister bought land and built several houses that she later rented our and passed down to her children.

Career 
In her 20s, Kauiomakawelinalaniokamanookalanipo worked as a telephone operator at the State Hospital in Kāne'ohe and later became an assistant to the chef at the hospital.

In 1933, after encouragement from her husband, she started taking hula lessons from her mother's cousin, Samuel Pua Ha'aheo. Zuttermeister formally graduated from Ha'aheo's class in 1935.

In 1936, Zuttermeister opened her own school for hula - Ilima Hula Hale. She continued teaching hula, traditional chants, and pahu drumming in the style of Pua Ha'aheo for more than 50 years. She taught her daughters, Noenoelani and Kuuipo, and her granddaughter, Hauoli as well.

Zuttermeister judged various hula competitions, including the Merrie Monarch Festival in Hilo, the King Kamehameha Traditional Hula and Chant Competition, and the Queen Lili'uokalani Trust's Hula Kahiko Amateur Contest. 

In 1983, she was recognized as a Living Treasure of Hawaii by the Honpa Hongwanji Mission.

She was a recipient of a 1984 National Heritage Fellowship awarded by the National Endowment for the Arts, which is the United States government's highest honor in the folk and traditional arts.

In 1989, four Zuttermeister generations performers represented Hawai'i in the Festival of American Folklife at the Smithsonian.

Death and legacy 
Zuttermeister died in 1994. Her daughter, Noenoelani took over her studio and continues to teach hula.

References 

1909 births
1994 deaths
National Heritage Fellowship winners
Hula dancers
Women in Hawaii